A number of places in the world, like the places named after places in other parts of Britain, were named after the Channel Islands, or some place therein. Not all are named directly for one of the islands, but are often named indirectly, such as for another place on the list.

United States

Jersey 
 New Jersey
 Jersey Shore, New Jersey
 Jersey City, New Jersey
 Jerseyville, New Jersey
 Clements, Maryland — named after Saint Clement, Jersey
 Jersey, Arkansas
 Jersey, Georgia — named for a Jersey bull, a breed that comes from the island of Jersey
 Jersey, Ohio
 Jersey, Virginia — named after the breed of cattle
 Jersey County, Illinois — named after its county seat and largest city, Jerseyville
 Jersey Township, Jersey County, Illinois
 Jersey Township, Licking County, Ohio — named after New Jersey by settlers from that state
 Jersey Island (California)
 Jerseyville, Illinois — named by a native of New Jersey

Guernsey 
 Guernsey, Indiana
 Guernsey, Iowa — named after Guernsey County, Ohio
 Guernsey, Ohio
 Guernsey, Wyoming
 Guernsey County, Ohio
 Sarnia, North Dakota — named for Sarnia, Ontario, which in turn was named for Guernsey (Sarnia is the Latin name for Guernsey)

Canada

Jersey 
 Caesarea, Ontario — (Caesarea is thought to be the Latin name for Jersey)
 Hermitage-Sandyville, Newfoundland and Labrador — named after Hermitage Rock, a tidal islet off the coast of Saint Helier, Jersey
 Jersey Harbour, Newfoundland and Labrador
 Jerseyside — neighborhood of Placentia, Newfoundland and Labrador
 Jerseyville, Ontario — named for New Jersey by settlers from that state
 St. Ouens, Manitoba — named for Saint Ouen, Jersey, one of its twelve parishes

Guernsey 
 Guernsey, Saskatchewan
 Guernsey Cove, Prince Edward Island
 Ramea, Newfoundland and Labrador — named for Le Ramée, a neighborhood/street in Saint Peter Port, the capital of Guernsey
 Sarnia, Ontario — named by Lieutenant Governor Sir John Colborne after Guernsey, where he'd previously been lieutenant governor (Sarnia is the Latin name for Guernsey)
 Sarnia No. 221, Saskatchewan

Alderney
 Alderney Landing, Dartmouth, Nova Scotia

Elsewhere

Jersey
 Jerseyville, New South Wales, Australia
 Saint Heliers, a suburb of Auckland, New Zealand (named after Saint Helier in Jersey)

References

Channel
Channel
Channel Islands-related lists